Frans Tuohimaa (born 19 August 1991) is a Finnish professional ice hockey goaltender who plays for Skellefteå AIK of the Swedish Hockey League (SHL).

Playing career
Tuohimaa was playing with Jokerit in the then Finnish SM-liiga before he was selected by the Edmonton Oilers in the 7th round (182nd overall) of the 2011 NHL Entry Draft.

Tuohimaa moved to league rivals HPK before moving to North America in March 2014, signing a two-year entry-level contract with the Edmonton Oilers organization.

He played the 2014–15 season within the Oilers affiliates, the Bakersfield Condors of the American Hockey League and the Bakersfield Condors of the ECHL. Unable to impact the Oilers' depth chart, Tuohimaa opted to return to Europe at the season's end by signing with Swedish HockeyAllsvenskan club, Leksands IF on 18 May 2015.

Following five further seasons in the Liiga, Tuohimaa as a free agent following the 2020–21 campaign and was signed to a one-year Kontinental Hockey League (KHL) contract with Russian club, HC Neftekhimik Nizhnekamsk, on 16 May 2021. Tuohimaa made 26 regular season appearances with Neftekhimik, registering nine wins and a 2.53 goals against average. In March 2022, Tuohimaa left Neftekhimik Nizhnekamsk during playoffs due to the Russian invasion of Ukraine.

On 17 May 2022, Tuohimaa opted to return to the Finnish Liiga, securing a one-year contract with Mikkelin Jukurit. In the 2022–23 season, Tuohimaa playing behind a porous defence collected 11 wins through 34 regular season games. With Jukurit out of post-season contention, Tuohimaa left the Liiga and signed for the remainder of the season with Swedish club, Skellefteå AIK of the SHL, on 15 February 2023.

Career statistics

Regular season and playoffs

References

External links

1991 births
Living people
Bakersfield Condors (1998–2015) players
Edmonton Oilers draft picks
Finnish ice hockey goaltenders
HIFK (ice hockey) players
Hokki players
HPK players
Jokerit players
Kiekko-Vantaa players
Leksands IF players
Mikkelin Jukurit players
HC Neftekhimik Nizhnekamsk players
Oklahoma City Barons players
Ice hockey players at the 2022 Winter Olympics
Olympic ice hockey players of Finland
Medalists at the 2022 Winter Olympics
Olympic gold medalists for Finland
Olympic medalists in ice hockey
Ice hockey people from Helsinki
SaiPa players
Skellefteå AIK players
Vaasan Sport players